Ernst Süß (31 August 1912 – 20 December 1943) was a Luftwaffe fighter ace and recipient of the Knight's Cross of the Iron Cross during World War II. During his career he was credited with 68 aerial victories.

Career
Süß was born on 31 August 1912 in Possessern, at the time in East Prussia, province of the Kingdom of Prussia within the German Empire, present-day Pozezdrze in northern Poland. As a reserve pilot, he was appointed to join 9./Jagdgeschwader 52 (JG 52—52nd Fighter Wing) as an Unteroffizier. With this unit he participated in the Battle of France and the Battle of Britain, without achieving any victory confirmed in this period.

The rise of General Ion Antonescu in Romania in 1940 led to a reorganization of his country's armed forces. In this, he was supported by a military mission from Germany, the Luftwaffenmission Rumänien (Luftwaffe Mission Romania) under the command of Generalleutnant (equivalent to major general) Wilhelm Speidel. III. Gruppe of JG 52 was transferred to Bucharest in mid-October and temporarily renamed I. Gruppe of Jagdgeschwader 28 (JG 28—28th Fighter Wing) until 4 January 1941. Its primary task was to train Romanian Air Force personnel. Here, Süß joined the trio of Hermann Graf, Alfred Grislawski and Heinrich Füllgrabe. Later, Leopold Steinbatz and Edmund Roßmann joined as well.

War against the Soviet Union

Following its brief deployment in the Balkan Campaign, III. Gruppe was back in Bucharest by mid-June. There, the unit was again subordinated to the Luftwaffenmission Rumänien and reequipped with the new, more powerful Bf 109F-4 model. On 21 June, the Gruppe was ordered to Mizil in preparation of Operation Barbarossa, the German invasion of the Soviet Union. Its primary objective was to provide fighter protection for the oil fields and refineries at Ploiești. Prior to the invasion, Major Gotthard Handrick was replaced by Major Albert Blumensaat as commander of III. Gruppe. Blumensaat was then replaced by Hauptmann Hubertus von Bonin on 1 October. At the time, von Bonin was still in convalescence so that Hauptmann Franz Höring, the commander of 9. Staffel, was also made the acting Gruppenkommandeur (group commander).

In the months following the beginning of Operation Barbarossa, the 9./JG 52, later dubbed the Karaya Quartet, became one of the most successful units of the Luftwaffe. Süß flew alongside Graf, Grislawski and Füllgrabe. He claimed his first victory on 8 August 1941 and in the next twelve months, fighting in the Caucasus and the Battle of Stalingrad, Süß reached a series of victories against the Soviets, for which he was awarded the Honour Goblet of the Luftwaffe on 4 May 1942, the German Cross in Gold on 29 June 1942. The Knight's Cross of the Iron Cross was awarded to him on 4 September 1942 following 50 aerial victories claimed.

On 22 July 1942, the Geschwaderkommodore (wing commander) of JG 52, Major Herbert Ihlefeld, was severely injured in a flight accident and had to surrender command during his convalescence. In consequence, Major Gordon Gollob, the commander of Jagdgeschwader 77 (JG 77—77th Fighter Wing), temporarily took over command of JG 52 as acting Geschwaderkommodore.  On 17 August, Gollob was ordered dispatch one Schwarm, a flight of four aircraft, of every III. Gruppe squadron to the Don-bend. The pilots selected for this mission included Süß, Graf and Füllgrabe.

In the spring of 1943, Süß was transferred to the Ergänzungsgruppe Ost, where he remained a long time as an instructor. With this unit he attained his 64th and last victory on the Eastern front on 31 May 1943.

Defense of the Reich
In response to political humiliation caused by de Havilland Mosquito bombing raids into Germany, Reichsmarschall Hermann Göring, the commander-in-chief of the Luftwaffe, ordered the formation of two specialized high-altitude Luftwaffe units. These units were Jagdgeschwader 25, commanded by Major Herbert Ihlefeld, and Jagdgeschwader 50, commanded by his friend Graf. Graf was permitted to choose his personnel and had his friends Süß, Füllgrabe and Grislawski transferred from III. Gruppe of JG 52.

Süß was made the Staffelkapitän (squadron leader) on 7 October 1943 of 9. Staffel of Jagdgeschwader 11. This unit fought in the Defense of the Reich, with which he won his last four victories. 

On 20 December 1943, the United States Army Air Forces (USAAF) bombed Bremen. In total 546 bombers, escorted by 491 escort fighters, targeted the port of Bremen. Defending against this attack, Süß shot down a Lockheed P-38 Lightning fighter but was himself shot down by USAAF fighters near Wardenburg, south of Oldenburg, in his Messerschmitt Bf-109 G-5 (Werknummer 15 709—factory number). Süß managed to bail out but was shot in his parachute by a USAAF pilot.

Summary of career

Aerial victory claims
According to US historian David T. Zabecki, Süß was credited with 68 aerial victories. Spick also lists Süß with 68 aerial victories claimed in an unknown number combat missions, 60 of which claimed on the Eastern Front. Mathews and Foreman, authors of Luftwaffe Aces – Biographies and Victory Claims, researched the German Federal Archives and found records for 65 aerial victory claims, plus one further unconfirmed claim, all but one on the Eastern Front.

Victory claims were logged to a map-reference (PQ = Planquadrat), for example "PQ 0683". These sectors were then subdivided into 36 smaller units to give a location area 3 × 4 km in size.

Awards
 Iron Cross (1939) 2nd and 1st Class
 Front Flying Clasp of the Luftwaffe in Gold
 Honor Goblet of the Luftwaffe on 4 May 1942 as Oberfeldwebel and pilot
 German Cross in Gold on 2 July 1942 as Oberfeldwebel in the 9./Jagdgeschwader 52
 Knight's Cross of the Iron Cross on 4 September 1942 as Oberfeldwebel and pilot in as pilot in the 9./Jagdgeschwader 52

Notes

References

Citations

Bibliography

 
 
 
 
 
 
 
 
 
 
 
 
 
 
 
 
 
 
 
 
 
 
 

1912 births
1943 deaths
People from Węgorzewo County
People from East Prussia
Luftwaffe pilots
German World War II flying aces
Recipients of the Knight's Cross of the Iron Cross
Luftwaffe personnel killed in World War II
Aviators killed by being shot down